Mother Teresa Catholic Secondary School is a Roman Catholic co-educational secondary school in London, Ontario, Canada. It was established in 2000 and is the largest secondary school in the London District Catholic School Board.

References

External links 
 

Memorials to Mother Teresa
High schools in London, Ontario
Catholic secondary schools in Ontario
Educational institutions established in 2000
2000 establishments in Ontario